Michael Ouellette is a Canadian former ice hockey center who was an All-American for Dartmouth.

Career
Ouellette's college career began in 2002 and he was an instant hit for the Dartmouth hockey team. Ouellette scored just over a point per game as a freshman and helped the Big Green win 20 games for the first time in 54 years. He was named as an alternate captain for his sophomore season but both he and the team declined. Both rebounded in 2005 and Ouellette led the team to another 20-win season. He was named team captain for his senior season and he led Dartmouth to its first ECAC Hockey title. The Big Green had been playing in the conference since 1961 and had never finished higher than third in the standings. The team had a chance to end their 26-year NCAA Tournament drought but a loss to Harvard in the semifinals resulted in their being dropped from the top-15 rankings. For his final season, Ouellette was named as an All-American as well as the top defensive forward in the conference while also leading Dartmouth in scoring.

The following season, Ouellette became a full-time professional player and performed well with the Charlotte Checkers. He played most of the next two seasons with the Hartford Wolf Pack, providing depth scoring. In 2009 he headed to Europe and played six seasons in the Erste Bank Eishockey Liga. He bounced around at first, despite scoring at least 20 goals in each of his first five seasons, but ended up joining Black Wings Linz at the right time. He was second on the Wings in postseason scoring as the team won the Austrian Championship in 2012.

Ouellette retired as a player in 2015 and moved to Hawaii where he earned a real estate license. Before the end of the year, he moved to Los Angeles and joined the Klabin Company. Since then he's become Vice President of the business and continued to work in that field.

Career statistics

Regular season and playoffs

Awards and honors

References

External links

1982 births
Living people
AHCA Division I men's ice hockey All-Americans
Canadian ice hockey centres
Ice hockey people from British Columbia
Sportspeople from Kamloops
Dartmouth Big Green men's ice hockey players
Springfield Falcons players
Charlotte Checkers (1993–2010) players
Hartford Wolf Pack players
KHL Medveščak Zagreb players
Graz 99ers players
EHC Black Wings Linz players
Vienna Capitals players